Ondrej Hekel (16 February 1944 – 23 July 2009) was a Czechoslovak male weightlifter, who competed in the 67.5 kg category and represented Czechoslovakia at international competitions.

During his career, Ondrej Hekel was Czechoslovakia's best weightlifter. For 12 years in a row, he won a national title (first in the lightweight, later middleweight), and he was named Czechoslovakian lifter of the year on three occasions. Internationally, his only overall medal came at the 1971 European Championships, where he placed third. In 1972, he was close to the medals at the Olympics (doubling as the World Championships), placing 4th. But Hekel collected event medals in the snatch, winning twice at the Europeans and once at the World Championships (1971). He won the silver medal in the snatch at the 1969 World Weightlifting Championships lifting 130.0 kg.

References

External links
 Zemřel Ondrej Hekel (Ondrej Hekel Died) at Vzpirani.cz
 

1944 births
2009 deaths
Czechoslovak male weightlifters
World Weightlifting Championships medalists
Slovak male weightlifters
Olympic weightlifters of Czechoslovakia
Weightlifters at the 1968 Summer Olympics
Weightlifters at the 1972 Summer Olympics
Weightlifters at the 1976 Summer Olympics